The Australian ghostshark (Callorhinchus milii) is a cartilaginous fish (Chondrichthyes) belonging to the subclass Holocephali (chimaera). Sharks, rays and skates are the other members of the cartilaginous fish group and are grouped under the subclass Elasmobranchii. Alternative names include elephant shark, makorepe (in Māori), whitefish, plough-nose chimaera, or elephant fish.

Morphology and biology
The fish is silvery in colour with iridescent reflections and dark, variable markings on the sides. It has an elongated body, smooth and torpedo shaped with two widely separated, triangular dorsal fins. They use their hoe-shaped snouts to probe the ocean bottom for invertebrates and small fishes.

From spring to autumn, adults migrate inshore to estuaries and bays and females lay their eggs on sandy or muddy substrates. The eggs are contained in large yellowish capsules. Maximum age is estimated to be 15 years.

This fish has three cone pigments for colour vision (like humans); its dorsal fin has a very sharp spine. The spine has been reputed to be venomous, but no serious injuries have yet been reported.

Distribution 
At present this species is regarded as being known from southern Australian and New Zealand waters. However it has been hypothesised with some supporting evidence that the New Zealand population may differ from the population found in Australian waters.

Fishing 
In South Australia, they are caught by some recreational fishers in inshore waters during autumn and winter, typically from surf beaches or sheltered beaches.

In New Zealand, Australian ghostsharks are exploited commercially, particularly during spring and summer when they migrate into shallow coastal waters. 

In Australia, they are caught by southern shark gillnet fishery, particularly in Bass Strait and south-east Tasmania, though this fishery targets the gummy shark, Mustelus antarcticus, and will sometimes discard ghostsharks due to the considerably lower price they fetch at market. They are also a popular target of recreational fishers in Westernport Bay, Victoria and in the inshore waters of south-east Tasmania. Their white flesh fillets are very popular with fish-and-chips restaurants in New Zealand and is sold as 'flake' or 'whitefish' in Australia.

Genome study
In January 2014, Nature reported research into the Australian ghostshark genome that showed they lack a single gene family that regulates the process of turning cartilage into bone, and indicates a gene duplication event gave rise to the transformation in bony vertebrates.

The Australian ghostshark was proposed as a model cartilaginous fish genome because of its relatively small genome size. Its genome is estimated to be 910 megabases long, which is the smallest among all the cartilaginous fishes and one-third the size of the human genome (3000 Mb). Because cartilaginous fishes are the oldest living group of jawed vertebrates, the Australian ghostshark genome will serve as a useful reference genome for understanding the origin and evolution of vertebrate genomes including humans, which shared a common ancestor with the Australian ghostshark about 450 million years ago. Studies so far have shown the sequence and the gene order (synteny) are more similar between human and elephant shark genomes than between human and teleost fish genomes (pufferfish and zebrafish), though humans are more closely related to teleost fishes than to the Australian ghostshark. The Elephant Shark Genome Project was launched with the aim to sequence the whole genome of the elephant shark.

Conservation status
The New Zealand Department of Conservation has classified the Australian ghost shark as "Not Threatened" with the qualifier "Conservation Dependent, Increasing" under the New Zealand Threat Classification System.

References

 
 Tony Ayling & Geoffrey Cox, Collins Guide to the Sea Fishes of New Zealand,  (William Collins Publishers Ltd., Auckland, New Zealand 1982) 
 Nelson, J. S. Fishes of the world (Wiley, New York  2006)  
 P. R. Last and J. D. Stevens Sharks and Rays of Australia (Intl Specialized Book Service Inc. June 1991) 
 Venkatesh B, Kirkness EF, Loh YH, Halpern AL, Lee AP, et al. (2007) Survey Sequencing and Comparative Analysis of the (Callorhinchus milii) Genome. PLoS Biol 5(4): e101 
 Sequencing project at the Institute of Molecular and Cell Biology (Singapore)

Bibliography 
 Katsu, Y., Kohno, S., Oka, K., Lin, X., Otake, S., Pillai, N. E., ... & Baker, M. E. (2019). Transcriptional activation of elephant shark mineralocorticoid receptor by corticosteroids, progesterone, and spironolactone. Science Signaling, 12(584), eaar2668.
 Katsu, Y., Kohno, S., Oka, K., Lin, X., Otake, S., Pillai, N. E., ... & Baker, M. E. (2018). Transcriptional Activation of Elephant Shark Mineralocorticoid Receptor by Corticosteroids, Progestins and Spironolactone. BioRxiv, 265348.

External links

 Species Description of Callorhinchus milii at www.shark-references.com
 
 Fishes of Australia : Callorhinchus milii

Australian ghostshark
Marine fish of Southern Australia
Marine fish of New Zealand
Australian ghostshark